Koit Pikaro (born 13 August 1949 in Keila) is an Estonian politician. He was a member of the IX Riigikogu and X Riigikogu.

He has been a member of Estonian Centre Party.

References

Living people
1949 births
Estonian Centre Party politicians
Members of the Riigikogu, 1999–2003
Members of the Riigikogu, 2003–2007
University of Tartu alumni
People from Keila